Stationery Office may refer to:

 Office of Public Sector Information, an administrative office in the government of the United Kingdom
 The Stationery Office, a publishing company